The Bishop of Thetford is an episcopal title which takes its name after the market town of Thetford in Norfolk, England. The title was originally used by the Normans in the 11th century, and is now used by a Church of England suffragan bishop.

The present Bishop of Thetford is a suffragan bishop of the Church of England Diocese of Norwich, in the Province of Canterbury, England. The title was resurrected under the Suffragan Bishops Act 1534. The Bishop of Thetford, along with the Bishop of Lynn, assists the diocesan Bishop of Norwich in overseeing the diocese, and has particular oversight of the Archdeaconry of Norfolk.

References

External links
 Crockford's Clerical Directory - Listings

 
Anglican suffragan bishops in the Diocese of Norwich